The 2000 Brighton International (also known as the 2000 Samsung Open for sponsorship reasons) was a men's tennis tournament played on indoor hard court in Brighton, United Kingdom the event was an International Series event which was part of the 2000 ATP Tour. The tournament was held from November 20 to 26.

Champions

Singles

 Tim Henman defeated  Dominik Hrbatý, 6–2, 6–2.

Doubles

 Michael Hill /  Jeff Tarango defeated  Paul Goldstein /  Jim Thomas, 6–3, 7–5.

References

Brighton International
Brighton International
Bright